HVG may refer to:
Heti Világgazdaság, a Hungarian weekly magazine
Honningsvåg Airport, Valan (IATA code), Norway
Havelbus Verkehrsgesellschaft mbH, the largest bus operating company in Brandenburg, Germany
Hudson View Gardens, a co-op in New York City